Turkey is a town in the Mopani District Municipality, located in the Limpopo province of South Africa.

References

Populated places in the Maruleng Local Municipality